To an Unknown God is a 1977 Spanish film directed by Jaime Chávarri. The film is about an aging man coming to terms with his homosexuality and mortality.  It was a pioneer in its frank and mature examination of homosexuality.

Plot 
José, a middle age magician, is an elegant discreet homosexual who lives alone and has an occasional affair with Miguel, a young politician who finds it more convenient in Madrid's high society to marry than assert his homosexuality. José is a man romantically possessed and obsessed by his childhood in Granada during the outbreak of the Spanish Civil War in the spring of 1936.

Now in his fifties, José returns to Granada and relives his childhood there. A time when he fell in love with García Lorca and had a youthful affair with one of Lorca's own lovers. Memories come flooding back to the mature José, of youthful sexual conquest, of Lorca's murder at the hands of Franco's agents, and his own early homosexual affairs. José's entire life is colored by his obsessions with García Lorca, his unknown God, to whom the film is dedicated.

José travels twice to Granada. First, he revisits a woman who is also obsessed with García Lorca's memory, and steals a photograph of the boy with whom he had his first sexual encounter; later, José returns to Madrid, to a party in search of his youth, and meets a pianist with whom he had sexual relations many years before but now does not remember.

When José returns to Madrid, he is a man tormented by his past, and in search of peace. Listening to a taped recording of García Lorca's famous "Ode to Walt Whitman", he desires nothing more than to face the rest of his life in loneliness, although his recent lover, Miguel has returned to his bed and wants to continue their affair. José realizes that he is really all alone in their world, alone with his God.

Cast
 Héctor Alterio as José
 Xabier Elorriaga as Miguel
 Maria Rosa Salgado as Adela
 Rosa Valenty as Clara
 Ángela Molina as Soledad
 Margarita Mas as older Soledad
 Mercedes Sampietro as Mercedes
 José Joaquin Boza as Pedro

Awards
The film was the Grand Prize winner at the Chicago International Film Festival of 1978 and was part of the American Film Institute series of Spanish films which traveled throughout North America in 1979–1980. Hector Alterio also won the Best actor award at the San Sebastian Film Festival in 1977 for his performance as José.

 3 Awards at San Sebastián International Film Festival: Best Spanish Film, Best Actor and OCIC Award.

References 
 Schwartz, Ronald, The Great Spanish Films: 1950- 1990,Scarecrow Press, London, 1991,

External links 
 

1977 films
1970s Spanish-language films
1977 LGBT-related films
1977 drama films
Spanish LGBT-related films
Spanish Civil War films
Madrid in fiction
Andalusia in fiction
Films directed by Jaime Chávarri
Gay-related films